Johann Grégoire (born 14 October 1972) is a French freestyle skier. He competed in the men's moguls event at the 2002 Winter Olympics.

References

External links
 

1972 births
Living people
French male freestyle skiers
Olympic freestyle skiers of France
Freestyle skiers at the 2002 Winter Olympics
People from Bar-le-Duc
Sportspeople from Meuse (department)
20th-century French people
21st-century French people